KFOY-TV, analog channel 9, was a commercial VHF television station licensed to Hot Springs, Arkansas, United States. The station operated from 1961 to 1963 and was owned by Donald W. Reynolds, founder of Donrey Media Group.

History
Channel 9 was assigned to Hot Springs by the FCC in 1952.

Construction was approved for KFOY in April 1960 after a meeting between the Hot Springs City Planning Commission and officers of Southwestern Operating Co. (for Donrey Media). The station was licensed to Donrey's American Television Co. The call letters were for "Fountain of Youth" to tie in with the local hot springs, once believed to have healing properties.

Studios, transmitter, and the  tower were located at 105 Whippoorwill Street on West Mountain in Hot Springs National Park. The station signed on at 1:00 pm CST on February 12, 1961, with a special open house telecast. Regular programming began at 5:00 pm CST.

Programming

KFOY-TV had no network affiliation when it began broadcasting, but later affiliated with NBC.  Programming consisted of movies, syndicated shows and local productions. A number of prominent entertainers appeared on the station while were working at local night clubs, and fan dancer Sally Rand had an exercise program during her stay in town.

Staff

Air personalities included newscaster Chad Lassiter; and weathercaster Tom Nichols, succeeded by Barbara Ann Stillings.

Harold E. "Hal" King was named general manager in mid-January 1961. Other staff members included Arie Landrum, program director; Bryan T. E. Bisney, production manager; Albert W. Scheer, Jr., chief engineer; C.J. "Gus" Dickson, commercial manager; Joe Wall, camera operator; Valerie Matthews, set designer; Gloria Lee Milton, receptionist; and Lillian B. Robbins, continuity writer and secretary.

Donrey Media transferred Bill Crews from Fort Smith, Arkansas, where Donrey owned KFSA-TV channel 5, to manage KFOY in 1962.

Demise

The station suffered from an inadequate coverage pattern as well as a declining Hot Springs population and its proximity to Little Rock; one of Donrey's competitors in Fort Smith, radio station KWHN, asked for channel 9 to be moved there to provide better competition. It suspended operations on April 17, 1963, citing $100,000 in debt.

In August 1963, the station and its facilities were sold to the Arkansas Educational Television Commission for $150,000 using a $100,000 gift from the Reynolds Foundation. AETC did not activate a channel 9 facility in the region until KETG, licensed to Arkadelphia and transmitting from Gurdon, began broadcasting on October 2, 1976.

References

Bibliography

Defunct television stations in the United States
FOY-TV
Hot Springs, Arkansas
FOY-TV
1961 establishments in Arkansas
1963 disestablishments in Arkansas
Television channels and stations established in 1961
Television channels and stations disestablished in 1963